The Seville Bridge is one of nine metal highway bridges in Fulton County, Illinois that were listed on the National Register of Historic Places. This particular one is located across the Spoon River in Seville. It was added to the National Register of Historic Places on October 29, 1980, along with the eight other bridges, as one of the "Metal Highway Bridges of Fulton County. Some of the other bridges include the Buckeye Bridge, Tartar's Ferry Bridge and the Bernadotte Bridge, all in Smithfield. Five of the nine bridges have been demolished, though Seville Bridge still stands.

Notes

Road bridges on the National Register of Historic Places in Illinois
Bridges in Fulton County, Illinois
Bridges completed in 1880
National Register of Historic Places in Fulton County, Illinois
Metal bridges in the United States
Parker truss bridges in the United States